Oyler High School is a public high school in Cincinnati, Ohio and one of many schools that make up the Cincinnati Public School District.  While undergoing renovations at its location on Hatmaker Street, Oyler was temporarily housed in the former Roberts School at 1700 Grand Avenue.

The Oyler Hatmakers wear black and white and are currently independent of a league.

Racism Controversy 
At a basketball game on January 15, 2021, accusations of racism toward Oyler players by parents and students from New Miami were made public.

References

External links
 Official website

High schools in Hamilton County, Ohio
Public high schools in Ohio